Shelly Bond (born Roeberg) is an American comic book editor, known for her two decades at DC Comics' Vertigo (DC Comics) imprint, for which she was executive editor from 2013 to 2016.

Career

Bond began working in the comics industry as an editorial assistant and editor at Comico: The Comic Company where she edited E-Man. Bond was hired by Karen Berger as an assistant editor at Vertigo Comics one month after the imprint was formed. She was promoted to executive editor and vice president of Vertigo Comics in 2013, taking the place of Berger. In April 2016, DC announced that they had let Bond go after restructuring. Bond launched Black Crown, a new imprint of IDW telling stories connected to a fictional English pub, in October 2017. Black Crown was shut down by IDW in 2019. Since then, Bond has compiled several projects with a variety of artists, funding them on Kickstarter.

Personal life
She is married to artist Philip Bond, with whom she has a son.

References

External links

Comic book editors
Vertigo Comics
Year of birth missing (living people)
Living people
Place of birth missing (living people)
DC Comics people